Arthritis & Rheumatology is a monthly peer-reviewed medical journal covering the natural history, pathophysiology, treatment, and outcome of the rheumatic diseases. It is an official journal of the American College of Rheumatology.

It was established in 1958 as Arthritis & Rheumatism and obtained its current name in 2014.

According to the Journal Citation Reports, the journal has a 2020 impact factor of 10.995.

References

External links 
 
 American College of Rheumatology

Publications established in 1958
Wiley (publisher) academic journals
Monthly journals
English-language journals
Rheumatology journals